The Pompano Beach Mets were a minor league baseball franchise located in Pompano Beach, FL that played in the Florida State League from 1969 to 1973. They were a farm team of the New York Mets and played at Pompano Beach Municipal Stadium.

Location: Pompano Beach, FL
League: Florida State League (1969–1973)
Affiliation: New York Mets (1969–1973)
Ballpark: Pompano Beach Municipal Stadium

Year-by-year record

New York Mets minor league affiliates
Defunct Florida State League teams
Pompano Beach, Florida
1969 establishments in Florida
1973 disestablishments in Florida
Defunct baseball teams in Florida
Baseball teams established in 1969
Baseball teams disestablished in 1973